Moncontour may refer to:

 Moncontour, Côtes-d'Armor, a commune in the Côtes-d'Armor department in France
 Moncontour, Vienne, a commune in the Vienne department in France
 The Battle of Moncontour in 1569